Ramzi Bourakba (born 20 December 1984 in Bordj Bou Arréridj) is an Algerian footballer who is currently playing as a forward for JSM Béjaïa in the Algerian Ligue Professionnelle 1.

Club career
On 3 January 2012 Bourakba joined Saudi Arabian club Najran SC until the end of the season.

References

External links
 
 

1984 births
Algeria A' international footballers
Algerian footballers
Algerian expatriate footballers
Algerian expatriate sportspeople in Saudi Arabia
Algerian Ligue Professionnelle 1 players
CR Belouizdad players
Expatriate footballers in Saudi Arabia
JS Kabylie players
Living people
Najran SC players
People from Bordj Bou Arréridj
USM El Harrach players
JSM Béjaïa players
Association football forwards
21st-century Algerian people